Nepenthes macrovulgaris (from Greek macro- "large" and Latin vulgaris "common, usual"), or the serpentine pitcher-plant, is a tropical pitcher plant endemic to Borneo. It is a lowland plant that typically grows at altitudes ranging from 300 to 1200 m in sub-montane forest clearings and mossy forest.  Its range is restricted to ultramafic habitats, including Mount Kinabalu, Mount Tambuyukon, the Danum Valley, the Tawai Range, the Meliau Range and Mount Silam, all in Sabah, Malaysian Borneo. Pitchers grow to around 25 cm high and range in colour from green to brown, with the speckled form being the most common.

Taxonomy

Nepenthes macrovulgaris is most closely related to N. hirsuta and N. hispida, and may be difficult to distinguish from them. Botanists Matthew Jebb and Martin Cheek suggest that N. macrovulgaris is also related to N. philippinensis, a species endemic to Palawan in the Philippines.

Etymology

Turnbull and Middleton, who described the species in 1988, explain that they chose the specific epithet macrovulgaris to:

[...] indicate a relatively large plant and to indicate that no single characteristic uniquely distinguishes this taxon from all others. The suffix vulgaris does not indicate that this species is either common or ordinary. On the contrary, it is quite striking. The epithet is an irregular combination of Greek and Latin. The name was used in the field to identify living material which was distributed to growers and this informal name is now commonly used by collectors. We feel that to change the name now would create unnecessary confusion.

Natural hybrids

The following natural hybrids involving N. macrovulgaris have been recorded.

N. albomarginata × N. macrovulgaris
N. macrovulgaris × N. rajah
N. macrovulgaris × N. reinwardtiana
N. macrovulgaris × N. tentaculata

References

Further reading

 Adam, J.H., C.C. Wilcock & M.D. Swaine 1992.  Journal of Tropical Forest Science 5(1): 13–25.
 Adam, J.H. 1997.  Pertanika Journal of Tropical Agricultural Science 20(2–3): 121–134.
 Adam, J.H. & C.C. Wilcock 1999.  Pertanika Journal of Tropical Agricultural Science 22(1): 1–7.
 Bauer, U., C.J. Clemente, T. Renner & W. Federle 2012. Form follows function: morphological diversification and alternative trapping strategies in carnivorous Nepenthes pitcher plants. Journal of Evolutionary Biology 25(1): 90–102. 
 Beaman, J.H. & C. Anderson 2004. The Plants of Mount Kinabalu: 5. Dicotyledon Families Magnoliaceae to Winteraceae. Natural History Publications (Borneo), Kota Kinabalu.
 Chung, A.Y.C. 2006. Biodiversity and Conservation of The Meliau Range: A Rain Forest in Sabah's Ultramafic Belt. Natural History Publications (Borneo), Kota Kinabalu. .
 Fretwell, S. 2013. Back in Borneo for giant Nepenthes. Part 1: Mesilau Nature Reserve, Ranau. Victorian Carnivorous Plant Society Journal 107: 6–13.
 Kurata, S. 2002.  Proceedings of the 4th International Carnivorous Plant Conference: 111–116.
 McPherson, S.R. & A. Robinson 2012. Field Guide to the Pitcher Plants of Borneo. Redfern Natural History Productions, Poole.
 Meimberg, H., A. Wistuba, P. Dittrich & G. Heubl 2001. Molecular phylogeny of Nepenthaceae based on cladistic analysis of plastid trnK intron sequence data. Plant Biology 3(2): 164–175. 
  Meimberg, H. 2002.  Ph.D. thesis, Ludwig Maximilian University of Munich, Munich.
 Meimberg, H. & G. Heubl 2006. Introduction of a nuclear marker for phylogenetic analysis of Nepenthaceae. Plant Biology 8(6): 831–840. 
 Meimberg, H., S. Thalhammer, A. Brachmann & G. Heubl 2006. Comparative analysis of a translocated copy of the trnK intron in carnivorous family Nepenthaceae. Molecular Phylogenetics and Evolution 39(2): 478–490. 
 Thong, J. 2006.  Victorian Carnivorous Plant Society Journal 81: 12–17.
 Turnbull, J.R. & A.T. Middleton 1981. A preliminary review of the Sabah species of Nepenthes, including a regional list and some selected localities. Unpublished mimeograph report to the Sabah Parks Trustees.
 Thorogood, C. 2010. The Malaysian Nepenthes: Evolutionary and Taxonomic Perspectives. Nova Science Publishers, New York.

Carnivorous plants of Asia
macrovulgaris
Endemic flora of Borneo
Plants described in 1988
Flora of Mount Kinabalu